Makhdoom Shah Mahmood Hussain Qureshi (born 22 June 1956) is a Pakistani politician who served as the 29th Minister of Foreign Affairs from 2018 to 2022. He previously held the post from 2008 to 2011. He had been a member of the National Assembly from August 2018 till January 2023.  He is the vice chairman of the Pakistan Tehreek-e-Insaf political party since December 2011.
Previously, he was a member of the National Assembly from 2002 to May 2018. 

Born in Multan, Punjab, Qureshi studied at Aitchison College and received Bachelor of Arts degree from Forman Christian College and Master of Arts degree from Corpus Christi College, Cambridge. He remained a member of the Provincial Assembly of the Punjab for nine years from 1985 to 1993 and had served in the provincial cabinet in various positions between 1988 and 1993. He served as the minister of State for Parliamentary Affairs in the federal cabinet from 1993 to 1996 and later as the Mayor of Multan from 2000 to 2002.

Early life and education

Qureshi was born on 22 June 1956 in Multan, Punjab to a wealthy, political and prominent Sufi Muslim family. His family claims to be of saintly lineage and caretaker of the Shrine of Bahauddin Zakariya in Multan, which provides the family with substantial income as well votes during the elections.  However, in 2014, he rejected the claims saying "I have never used religion for political gain. I have never dragged devotees of sufi saints in political matters, and those who vote for me do it of their free will." after his brother accused Qureshi was using the names of Sufi saints for political gains and Qureshi using donations for the PTI.

Qureshi is fluent in Urdu, English, Saraiki. Qureshi's father Makhdoom Sajjad Hussain Qureshi was former member of Senate of Pakistan and 15th Governor of the Punjab from 1985 to 1988 and was close friend of then President of Pakistan Muhammad Zia-ul-Haq who appointed him as governor of Punjab. Qureshi received his early education from Aitchison College, Lahore, a bachelor's from Forman Christian College and received MA (Law) and MA (History) degree from Corpus Christi College, Cambridge. He also holds a B.A. degree from University
of the Punjab.

Qureshi is married and he is a father of one son, named Zain Hussain Qureshi and two daughters. Qureshi is an agriculturalist and was the president of the Farmers Association of Pakistan.

Political career
Qureshi was elected for the first time to the Provincial Assembly of the Punjab from Multan in 1985 Pakistani general election which were held on a non-party basis during the military government of Muhammad Zia-ul-Haq. He joined the Pakistan Muslim League (PML) in 1986.

Pakistan Muslim League (N) 
Qureshi later joined the faction of PML led by Nawaz Sharif, which would later become PML (N). When PML split in 1988 after the death of Zia-ul-Haq,  and was re-elected for the second time to the Provincial Assembly of the Punjab from Multan in 1988 Pakistani general election and served as the Minister of Planning and Development in the provincial cabinet of Punjab of then Chief Minister of Punjab Nawaz Sharif from November 1988 to August 1990.

Qureshi was re-elected for the third time to the Provincial Assembly of the Punjab from Multan as a candidate of PML N in 1990 Pakistani general election and served as the Minister of Finance in Chief Minister Manzoor Wattoo's provincial cabinet of Punjab from 1990 to 1993. In 1993 he joined Pakistan People's Party.

Qureshi was elected for the first time to the National Assembly of Pakistan from Multan as a candidate of PPP in 1993 Pakistani general election. He was appointed as Minister of State for Parliamentary Affairs under then Prime Minister of Pakistan Benazir Bhutto ministry. In November, 1996, he was appointed as the spokesman of PPP.

Qureshi was defeated in the 1997 Pakistani general election by Makhdoom Javed Hashmi of PML-N.  He was offered a position in the Council of Economic Advisers to then President of Pakistan Pervez Musharraf, which he refused.

Qureshi served as the District Nazim (mayor) of Multan from 2000 to 2002. During his mayor period, he well administrated the Multan district and oversaw a number of development projects.

He was re-elected for the second time to the National Assembly of Pakistan from Multan in 2002 Pakistani general election on PPP seat and defeated Makhdoom Javed Hashmi. Reportedly, he used his influence as a mayor of Multan to win the 2002 elections. In 2006, Benazir Bhutto appointed Qureshi as the President of Pakistan Peoples Party Punjab to revive the popularity of PPP in southern Punjab given his good experience. Reportedly, Qureshi slapped an officer for beating a party activist of PPP in 2006.

He was re-elected for the third time to the National Assembly of Pakistan from Multan in 2008 Pakistani general election.

Foreign minister

Reportedly, Qureshi was a potential candidate for the Prime Minister of Pakistan in the coalition government headed by the PPP. However, Qureshi was instead given the post of Minister of Foreign Affairs in the cabinet of Prime Minister Yousaf Raza Gillani.

After taking charge of the office, Qureshi immediately made clear that he was committed to establishing peace in the region and that maintaining friendly ties with neighbouring India were amongst his top priorities. Qureshi went on his first visit as foreign minister to China in October 2008 with then Defence Minister of Pakistan Ahmad Mukhtar and then President of Pakistan Asif Ali Zardari.

In 2011, Qureshi faced criticism in Pakistan when it was discovered that his son, Zain H. Qureshi, was working as a Legislative Fellow in the office of Senator John Kerry

In February 2011, the Government of Pakistan reduced the number of cabinet seats and during the transition, Qureshi was offered the position of Minister of Water and Power. He declined, saying that he was "not interested in water and power ministry in place of foreign affairs."

In February 2011, he lost the portfolio of Foreign Minister following the Raymond Davis affair.

In November 2011, Qureshi resigned from the PPP where he had been for the past 20 years. He also quit his National Assembly membership saying that "I had joined the PPP under Benazir Bhutto’s leadership, and PPP was no longer a party of Shaheed Mohtarma Benazir Bhutto; it is now Zardari league. He said he did not want to be a part of Zardari league and announced to resign from the party membership."

Qureshi is one of three prominent politicians from Multan District, the other two being the Yousaf Raza Gillani and Javed Hashmi (Multan II) and are considered political rivals to each other. It was reported that Qureshi would re-join PML-N.

Pakistan Tehreek-e-Insaf  
In late November 2011, Qureshi announced joining the Pakistan Tehreek-i-Insaf (PTI) at a rally in Ghotki. On 4 December 2011, he was appointed as the first Vice Chairman of Pakistan Tehreek-e-Insaf as its parliamentary leader in National Assembly of Pakistan. In 2016 intra-party elections, Qureshi was re-appointed as the Vice Chairman of PTI, which is considered one of the three senior most positions in the party. He was re-elected to the National Assembly from Multan in 2013 Pakistani general election on the ticket of Pakistan Tehreek-e-Insaf.

2018 general election

He was re-elected to the National Assembly as a candidate of PTI from Constituency NA-156 (Multan-III) in 2018 Pakistani general election. Following his successful election, he emerged as PTI's nominee for the office of Speaker of the National Assembly. Reportedly, Imran Khan convinced him to take the office because of his long parliamentary experience. However Qureshi showed reluctance to take the portfolio.

On 18 August, Imran Khan formally announced his federal cabinet structure and Qureshi was named as Minister for Foreign Affairs. On 20 August 2018, he was sworn in as Federal Minister for Foreign Affairs in the federal cabinet of Prime Minister Imran Khan.

2021 Israel comments 

On May 21, 2021, while he was in New York City at an emergency session held by the United Nations General Assembly on 20 May to discuss a response to the 2021 Israel–Palestine crisis, Qureshi conducted an interview with American journalist Bianna Golodryga on CNN. During the interview, Qureshi stated: "Israel is losing out. They're losing the media war despite their connections"; Golodryga asked, "What are their connections?"; to which Qureshi replied, "Deep pockets." before elaborating further: "Well, they are very influential people. I mean, they control media." The comment sparked controversy. Other journalists, including Mehdi Hasan, condemned the FM's remark. However, he was commended by Muslims.

Personal life
On 3 July 2020, Qureshi announced he had tested positive for COVID-19 days after holding high-profile meetings including one with U.S. special representative on Afghanistan Zalmay Khalilzad in Islamabad. He eventually recovered.

References

External links

1956 births
Living people
Aitchison College alumni
Alumni of Corpus Christi College, Cambridge
Finance Ministers of Punjab, Pakistan
Foreign Ministers of Pakistan
Forman Christian College alumni
Pakistan People's Party politicians
Pakistan Tehreek-e-Insaf MNAs
Pakistani MNAs 1993–1996
Pakistani MNAs 2002–2007
Pakistani MNAs 2008–2013
Pakistani MNAs 2013–2018
Pakistani MNAs 2018–2023
Pakistani people of Arab descent
Pakistani Shia Muslims
People from Multan
Politicians from Multan
Punjab MPAs 1985–1988
Punjab MPAs 1988–1990
Punjab MPAs 1990–1993
Shah Mahmood